Kim Jung-hyuk was former South Korean football player. He is currently the manager of Mokpo City FC.

Honours

Player
Chunnam Dragons
 FA Cup Wnners (1) : 1997

Individual
 FA Cup MVP (1): 1997

References

External links 

1968 births
Living people
South Korean footballers
South Korea international footballers
Association football midfielders
South Korean football managers
Busan IPark players
Jeonnam Dragons players
K League 1 players
Myongji University alumni